The Builder is a 2010 feature film directed by Rick Alverson. The film features actor Colm O'Leary (New Jerusalem) in his debut performance as an Irish immigrant struggling to reconcile the American ideal and its manifestation in the real world. It was the first feature film released by the independent music label Jagjaguwar.

References

External links
 

2010 films
2010 drama films